Sir Patrick Sheehy (2 September 1930 – 23 July 2019) was a British businessman who was chairman of British American Tobacco. In 1992, he was appointed chairman of the Inquiry into Police Responsibilities and Rewards (known as the Sheehy Inquiry), charged with reviewing police services in the United Kingdom.

He was knighted in the 1991 New Year Honours.

References

1930 births
2019 deaths
British business executives
British American Tobacco people
Businesspeople awarded knighthoods
Knights Bachelor
People from Yangon
People educated at Ampleforth College
Irish Guards soldiers